László Fábián may refer to:

László Fábián (pentathlete) (born 1963), Hungarian Olympic modern pentathlete and fencer
László Fábián (canoeist) (1936–2018), Hungarian Olympic sprint canoer